Brush Creek is a stream in Monroe and Shelby counties of the U.S. state of Missouri. It is a tributary of North Fork Salt River.

Brush Creek was so named on account of brush near its course.

See also
List of rivers of Missouri

References

Rivers of Monroe County, Missouri
Rivers of Shelby County, Missouri
Rivers of Missouri